The Hero's Journey to the Third Pole is an Icelandic documentary film from 2020, directed by Andri Snær Magnason and Anní Ólafsdóttir. It documents the efforts of Anna Tara Edwards and musician  to put on a concert to raise awareness of bipolar disorder, and mental illness more generally, in Nepal.

The film was nominated in five categories at the 2021 Edda Awards, and Högni won the award for Best Music (Tónlist ársins).

References

External links 

 The Hero's Journey to the Third Pole at the Icelandic Film Centre
 

2020 films
Icelandic documentary films